Yuan Zhen (died 370), courtesy name Yanren, was a Chinese military general of the Jin dynasty (266–420). He had a long career serving the Jin dynasty but he was mostly known for his rebellion in 370.  After failing to build a canal to secure the Jin forces' supply route during Huan Wen's campaign against Former Yan, Huan Wen was quick to blame Yuan Zhen after he returned defeated. In response, Yuan Zhen revolted in Shouchun in 369 but would die not long after. His son Yuan Qin continued the rebellion, but he was defeated and executed in 371.

Career under the Jin dynasty 
Not much is known about Yuan Zhen's background or early life except that he originated from Chen Commandery. He appeared to have first served as one of Yu Yi's general in the 340s. After Yu Yi's death in 345, one of his peers Gan Zan (干瓚) decided to revolt and kill Yu Yi's Champion General Cao Ju (曹據). Yuan Zhen allied himself with Jiang Bin (江虨), Zhu Dao (朱燾) and Mao Muzhi, and together they put down the rebellion.

Yuan Zhen was present during the early northern expeditions that followed Later Zhao's hasty decline in 350. He was serving as Administrator of Lujiang around this time, and he captured Ran Wei's city of Hefei in 350. Later in 356, Yuan Zhen, now as Dragon-Soaring General, helped repair the imperial tombs in Luoyang after Huan Wen successfully captured the city. In 362, he was stationed in Runan after he was made General of the Household Gentlemen of the West, Chief of military affairs in Yuzhou, Sizhou, Bingzhou, and Jizhou, and Inspector of Yuzhou.

At Runan, Yuan Zhen helped defend Luoyang from the Former Yan threat. The Yan general Lü Hu (呂護) attacked Luoyang in 362, so Yuan Zhen assisted by keeping the ancient capital supplied with rice before falling back to Shouchun. Yuan Zhen's authority was further strengthened as he was appointed Chief Controller in Sizhou, Jizhou, and Bingzhou in 363. The following year in 364, Yan's regent Murong Ping led the attack together with Li Hong (李洪). Huan Wen ordered Yuan Zhen to defend Pengcheng while carving out a road to help the transport of supplies. Ultimately, Luoyang fell to Yan in 365, as Emperor Ai of Jin's death forced Huan Wen to withdraw.

Yuan Zhen was one of the main benefactors in Huan Wen's expedition to conquer Former Yan in 369 together with Huan Chong, Chi Yin (郗愔) and others. During the campaign, Huan Wen was faced with a recurring problem as his supply routes were held back by a drought that made the rivers too shallow for his ships to sail. Huan Wen sent Yuan Zhen to attack Qiao and Liangguo commanderies to open up the dam at Shimen (石門; north of present-day Fuyang, Anhui) and allow water to flow through the rivers. However, Yuan Zhen did capture the commanderies, but he could not release the water from the dam. Furthermore, Yan forces led by Murong De later arrived at Shimen and defeated Yuan Zhen's army. As a result, Huan Wen's supply could not reach him, contributing to his decisive defeat at the Battle of Fangtou.

Yuan Zhen's Rebellion 
Huan Wen was furious and humiliated by his latest defeat. He fully blamed Yuan Zhen for not securing his supply route, but part of this also had to do with Huan Wen wanting to save face and deflect fault. Huan Wen demanded the court strip him off his office and reduce him to a commoner. Yuan Zhen called his accusations slanders and refused to accept it. Yuan Zhen sent word to the Jin court about Huan Wen's own crime, but the court ignored him. Thus, Yuan Zhen decided to rebel in Shouchun in 369, offering submission to both Former Yan and Former Qin.

Former Yan was first to receive his submission, and wanted to make Yuan Zhen Commissioner Bearing Credentials and a few other important titles. However, their envoy Wen Tong (溫統) passed away on the way to Yuan Zhen, so Yuan Zhen never received his titles. At the beginning of 370, Yuan Zhen suspected that his Interior Ministers Zhu Xian (朱憲) and Zhu Bin (朱斌) were in touch with Huan Wen, so he had them both killed.

Yuan Zhen died naturally on the 10th of April in 370. His son Yuan Qin (袁瑾) would succeed him after the Administrator of Chen Commandery, Zhu Fu (朱輔) acclaimed him.

Children 
Yuan Zhen had at least three sons: Yuan Shuangzi (袁雙之), Yuan Aizhi (袁愛之) and Yuan Qin. Yuan Shuangzi and Yuan Aizhi were the ones who killed Zhu Xian and Zhu Bin for their father.

Yuan Qin 
Yuan Qin (died 371) succeeded Yuan Zhen and continued the rebellion. Unlike his father, the rebellion's leadership was evenly distributed between him and Zhu Fu. Yan accepted Yuan Qin's succession, and made him Inspector of Yuzhou while Zhu Fu was made Inspector of Yangzhou.

Reinforcements from Qin and Yan were sent in to support Yuan Qin, but they were blocked by Huan Wen's generals Zhu Yao (竺瑤) and Huan Shiqian. Yuan Qin's forces were defeated by Zhu Yao at Wuqiu. Near the end of the year, a large force led by Huan Wen routed Yuan Qin at Shouchun. Yan wanted to support Yuan Qin by sending Meng Gao (孟高) but Meng was called back due to Qin forces invading Yan.

At the beginning of 371, Yuan Qin requested aid from Qin for the last time after Qin had conquered Yan the year prior. Yuan Qin became Qin's Inspector of Yangzhou and sent Zhang Ci and Wang Jian (王堅) to reinforce him. However, once again, Yuan Qin's reinforcements were defeated by Huan Yi and Huan Shiqian. The Qin army's defeat caused Yuan Qin's troops to scatter and Shouchun soon fell in February. Huan Wen sent Yuan Qin and Zhu Fu's clan to the capital, where they were all executed.

References 

 Fang, Xuanling (ed.) (648). Book of Jin (Jin Shu).
 Sima, Guang (1084). Zizhi Tongjian.

370 deaths
Jin dynasty (266–420) generals